The Anglican Church of St David in Barton St David, Somerset, England, was built in the 12th to 15th centuries. It is a Grade II* listed building.

History

The church was built between the 12th and 15th centuries. It underwent a Victorian restoration in the 19th century.

The parish is part of the Wheathill benefice, within the Diocese of Bath and Wells.

Architecture

The stone building has Doulting stone dressings and a tiled roof. It consists of a two-bay chancel and three-bay nave with one-bay transepts. The three-stage octagonal north-west tower was added in the 15th century. The Norman north doorway is of hamstone.

The interior fittings are mostly 18th or 19th century but there is a 13th-century stone font. Within the church is a roll of honour and memorial to men from the village who fought in World War I.

See also  
 List of ecclesiastical parishes in the Diocese of Bath and Wells

References

Grade II* listed buildings in South Somerset
Grade II* listed churches in Somerset
Church of England church buildings in South Somerset